Omega Canis Majoris, Latinized from ω Canis Majoris, is a solitary, blue-white-hued star in the equatorial constellation of Canis Major. It is visible to the naked eye with an apparent visual magnitude of about 4. Based upon an annual parallax shift of just 3.58 mas as seen from Earth, this system is located roughly 910 light-years from the Sun.

This star has a stellar classification of B2 IV-Ve, indicating it is a Be star showing a mixed spectrum of a main sequence star and a subgiant. One of the most observed Be stars of the Southern Hemisphere, Omega Canis Majoris is classified as a Gamma Cassiopeiae-type variable star. Both the luminosity and the radial velocity vary with a primary cyclical period of 1.372 days. The variation in brightness, ranging from magnitude +3.60 to +4.18, shows changes over time, which suggests there are two overlapping periods of 1.37 and 1.49 days. The star also undergoes transient periodicities following outbursts.

This is a massive star with ten times the mass of the Sun and 6.2 times the Sun's radius. At an estimated age of 22.5 million years, it is radiating 13,081 times the Sun's luminosity from its photosphere at an effective temperature of 21,878 K. The star is being viewed nearly pole on, so the measured projected rotational velocity of 80 km/s is only a fraction of the true equatorial velocity, estimated as 350 km/s. It is surrounded by a symmetric circumstellar decretion disk of material that is being heated by the star, which in turn is inserting emission lines into the combined spectrum.

References

External links
</ref>

B-type main-sequence stars
B-type subgiants
Be stars
Gamma Cassiopeiae variable stars
Canis Majoris, Omega
Canis Major
Durchmusterung objects
Canis Majoris, 28
056139
035037
2749